Hakeem Sekou Jeffries (born August 4, 1970) is an American politician and attorney who has been House Minority Leader and leader of the House Democratic Caucus in the U.S. House of Representatives since 2023. Jeffries is in his sixth House term, having represented New York's 8th congressional district, anchored in southern and eastern Brooklyn, since 2013.

Before his election to Congress in 2012, Jeffries served three terms in the New York State Assembly, representing the 57th district, and worked as a corporate lawyer. He chaired the House Democratic Caucus from 2019 to 2023 and in November 2022 was elected caucus leader unopposed, succeeding Nancy Pelosi.

Early life and career
Jeffries was born in New York City, at Brooklyn Hospital Center to Laneda Jeffries, a social worker, and Marland Jeffries, a state substance-abuse counselor. He grew up in Crown Heights, Brooklyn and his heritage traces back to Virginia, Georgia, Maryland, and Cape Verde.

Jeffries graduated from Midwood High School in 1988. He then studied political science at Binghamton University, graduating in 1992 with a Bachelor of Arts degree with honors. During his time at Binghamton he became a member of the Kappa Alpha Psi fraternity.

Jeffries continued his education at Georgetown University's McCourt School of Public Policy, earning a Master of Public Policy degree in 1994. He then attended New York University School of Law, where he was a member of the New York University Law Review. He graduated in 1997 with a Juris Doctor degree.

After graduating from law school, Jeffries spent one year as a law clerk for Judge Harold Baer Jr. of the U.S. District Court for the Southern District of New York. From 1998 to 2004, he was in private practice at the law firm Paul, Weiss, Rifkind, Wharton & Garrison. In 2004, he became an in-house litigator for Viacom and CBS, where he worked on litigation stemming from the Super Bowl XXXVIII halftime show controversy. During Jeffries's time at Paul, Weiss, he also served as director of intergovernmental affairs for the New York State Chapter of the National Association of Minority Contractors and as the president of Black Attorneys for Progress.

New York State Assembly

Elections
In 2000, Jeffries challenged incumbent Assemblyman Roger Green in the Democratic primary, criticizing Green for inattentiveness to his constituents' needs and preoccupation with pursuing higher office (Green had run for New York City Public Advocate in 1997 and had spoken of his plans to run for Congress upon the retirement of Edolphus Towns). A contentious debate between the two candidates, moderated by Dominic Carter on NY1, ended prematurely after Jeffries began his closing statement by saying "the issue in this race is not age—yes, the assemblyman is older, I'm younger. It's not religion—yes, the assemblyman is a practicing Muslim and I grew up in the Cornerstone Baptist Church." Green interrupted Jeffries to protest, "practicing Muslim? Where'd that come from? I'm absolutely offended, are you trying to polarize our community?", before walking out of the studio, later accusing Jeffries of playing "the religion card". Jeffries contended that his point was that voters should focus on the issues rather than the age or religion of the candidates. Jeffries lost the Democratic primary 59% to 41%, but remained on the Independence Party line in the general election, receiving 7% of the vote to Green's 90%.

During post-census redistricting, Jeffries's home was drawn one block outside of Green's Assembly district. Jeffries was still legally permitted to run in the district for the 2002 cycle, as state law requires only that a candidate to live in the same county as a district they seek in the first election after a redistricting, but this complicated his path. He called the redrawing of the district a "desperate act by a career politician trying to save his government job". Green responded that the lines had actually been redrawn to remove parts of Jeffries's affluent Prospect Heights neighborhood in favor of public housing, and insisted that he did not even know where Jeffries lived.

Tensions continued to be high throughout the rematch, with Jeffries at one point criticizing Green for accepting $3,700 in support from the Patrolmen's Benevolent Association of the City of New York, using a press release to link the union to the torture of Abner Louima. Jeffries was later forced to admit that a political club he had founded, Brooklyn Freedom Democratic Association, had been behind three anonymous mail pieces sent during the last week of the election, two of which attacked Green for inaction as a legislator, and a third of which falsely implied that presumptive Democratic gubernatorial nominee Carl McCall supported Jeffries when he had in fact endorsed Green. Jeffries lost the primary, 52% to 38%.

After the July 23, 2003, murder of Jeffries's close friend and political ally, James Davis, Jeffries was considered a potential successor to Davis on the New York City Council. Davis had named Jeffries as a preferred replacement should he be elected to higher office. After the Democratic nomination went to Davis's surviving brother Geoffrey, who was mired in a domestic violence scandal, Jeffries was considered for the Working Families Party nomination, but he did not put his name forward for consideration. Tish James was ultimately nominated by the WFP and elected.

The lasting effects of the 2002 redistricting left Jeffries notably unable to challenge Green in the 2004 Democratic primary, which took place just months after Green had been forced to resign his seat by Sheldon Silver and Democratic leadership after pleading guilty to billing the state for false travel expenses. Green was ultimately renominated unopposed.

In 2006 Green decided to retire from the Assembly to run for the U.S. House from New York's 10th congressional district against incumbent Democratic U.S. Representative Ed Towns. Jeffries ran for the 57th district again and won the Democratic primary, defeating Bill Batson and Freddie Hamilton with 64% of the vote. In the general election, he handily defeated Republican nominee Henry Weinstein.

Jeffries was reelected in 2008, defeating Republican nominee Charles Brickhouse with 98% of the vote. In 2010 he was reelected to a third term, easily defeating Republican nominee Frank Voyticky.

Tenure
During his six years in the state legislature Jeffries introduced over 70 bills. In response to a series of toy recalls, he introduced bill A02589, which would penalize retailers and wholesalers who knowingly sell hazardous or dangerous toys that have been the subject of a recall. In 2010, Governor David Paterson signed the Stop-and-Frisk database bill that banned police from compiling names and addresses of those stopped but not arrested during street searches. Jeffries wrote and sponsored that law. He also sponsored and passed house bill A.9834-A (now law), the Inmate-base gerrymandering law that ended counting prison populations of upstate districts as part of the public population, becoming the second state to end this practice.

Committee assignments

 State House Committee on Banks
 State House Committee on Codes
 State House Committee on Corporations, Authorities, and Commissions
 State House Committee on Correction
 State House Committee on Housing
 State House Committee on Judiciary
 State House Subcommittee on Banking in Underserved Communities
 State House Subcommittee on Mitchell-Lama
 State House Subcommittee on Transitional Services
 State House Subcommittee on Trust and Estates

U.S. House of Representatives

Elections

The district, which includes the Brooklyn communities of Fort Greene, Clinton Hill, Bed-Stuy, Brownsville, East New York, Canarsie, Mill Basin and Coney Island along with South Ozone Park and Howard Beach in Queens, had previously been the 10th, represented by 30-year incumbent Democrat Edolphus Towns.

Jeffries expected to give Towns a strong challenge in the Democratic primary—the real contest in this heavily Democratic, black-majority district. But with Jeffries assembling "a broad coalition of support" and having more cash than the incumbent, Towns announced his retirement on April 16, leaving Jeffries to face city councilman Charles Barron in the Democratic primary.

On June 11, 2012, former Mayor Ed Koch, Congressman Jerrold Nadler, Councilman David Greenfield, and Assemblyman Dov Hikind gathered with several other elected officials to support Jeffries and denounce Barron. The officials called Barron antisemitic and denounced his allegedly antisemitic statements, while also denouncing his support of Zimbabwe ruler Robert Mugabe and former Libya ruler Muammar Gaddafi. Barron responded that such attacks were a distraction from bread-and-butter issues.

Green Party candidate Colin Beavan called on Jeffries to "get the money out of politics", noting that as of his March 2012 filing, "he had received about $180,000, or 35 percent of his funds, from Wall Street bankers and their lawyers". Beavan added that Jeffries gets many campaign donations from charter school backers and hedge fund managers. After primary night, when asked about his two most important concerns, Jeffries replied eliminating the "crushing burden" of private religious school education costs.

After outraising him by hundreds of thousands of dollars, Jeffries defeated Barron in the June 26 primary election, 72% to 28%. A New York Daily News post-election editorial noted that Barron had been "repudiated" in all parts of the district, including among neighbors on Barron's own block in East New York, where he lost 57–50. The Daily News also analyzed Jeffries's donations in the last weeks of the campaign and found almost 50% came from out of state. He defeated Beavan and Republican Alan Bellone in the November general election with 71% of the vote, but not before declining to attend a pre-primary debate with third-party candidates, saying that the presence of the Green Party and Republican candidates at the debate would "confuse" voters.

On January 3, 2013, Jeffries was sworn in to the 113th Congress.

Bills
In addition to legislation mentioned above, on April 11, 2013, Jeffries introduced the Prison Ship Martyrs' Monument Preservation Act (H.R. 1501; 113th Congress). The bill would direct the Secretary of the Interior to study the suitability and feasibility of designating the Prison Ship Martyrs' Monument in Fort Greene Park in Brooklyn as a unit of the National Park System (NPS). Jeffries said, "as one of America's largest revolutionary war burial sites and in tribute to the patriots that lost their lives fighting for our nation's independence, this monument deserves to be considered as a unit of the National Park Service." On April 28, 2014, the Prison Ship Martyrs's Monument Preservation Act was passed by the House.

On July 15, 2014, Jeffries, who in private practice addressed intellectual property issues, introduced the To establish the Law School Clinic Certification Program of the United States Patent and Trademark Office (H.R. 5108; 113th Congress), which would establish the Law School Clinic Certification Program of the United States Patent and Trademark Office (USPTO) to be available to accredited law schools for the ten-year period after enactment of the Act.

In 2015, Jeffries led the effort to pass The Slain Officer Family Support Act, which extended the tax deadline for people making donations to organizations supporting the families of deceased NYPD Detectives Wenjian Liu and Rafael Ramos. The families of the officers, who had been killed in their patrol car on December 20, 2014, in the Bedford-Stuyvesant section of Jeffries's district, had been the recipients of charitable fundraising. Before the law's enactment, people would have had to make those contributions by December 31, 2014, to qualify for a tax deduction in connection with taxes filed in 2015. With the change, contributions made until April 15, 2015, were deductible. President Obama signed the bill into law on April 1, 2015.

Roles

Democratic Caucus Chair
On November 28, 2018, Jeffries defeated California Congresswoman Barbara Lee to become chair of the House Democratic Caucus. His term began when the new Congress was sworn in on January 3, 2019. In this role, he was the fifth-ranking member of the Democratic leadership.

First impeachment of President Donald Trump
On January 15, 2020, Jeffries was selected as one of seven House managers presenting the impeachment case against Trump during his trial before the United States Senate. On January 22, 2020, a protester in the Senate gallery interrupted Jeffries by yelling comments at the senators seated a floor below. Jeffries quickly responded with a scripture verse, Psalm 37:28—"For the Lord loves justice and will not abandon his faithful ones"—before continuing with his testimony.

House Democratic Caucus leadership
With the endorsement of outgoing Speaker Pelosi, Jeffries was elected unopposed as House Democratic Leader for the 118th Congress in November 2022, becoming the first African American person to lead a party caucus in either chamber of Congress. Nominated for Speaker by the caucus in the subsequent election, he received 212 votes, all from Democrats, on every ballot. When Kevin McCarthy was elected Speaker, Jeffries handed him the gavel after a 15-minute speech.

Committee assignments

 Committee on the Judiciary
 Subcommittee on Courts, Intellectual Property and the Internet
 Subcommittee on Regulatory Reform, Commercial and Antitrust Law
 Committee on the Budget

Caucus memberships

 Congressional Progressive Caucus
 Congressional Black Caucus
 U.S.–Japan Caucus

Political positions
Jeffries is considered a more centrist Democrat in the House; he has said he is willing to work with Republicans "whenever possible but we will also push back against extremism whenever necessary." He also wants to have good and working relationships with more progressive Democrats. Since taking federal office, Jeffries has been called "a rising star". He has been appointed to the House Judiciary Committee Task Force on Over Criminalization, and was also appointed the whip of the Congressional Black Caucus (CBC). He plays in the infield on the Congressional Baseball Team.

Since 2006, Jeffries has been a cautious supporter of Bruce Ratner's controversial Atlantic Yards project. He has opposed the Keystone XL pipeline, but also voted against an amendment that would have restricted sales of oil transported on the pipeline to within the United States. At a rally in July 2014, he said: "Israel should not be made to apologize for its strength." Citing his own childhood growing up in Crown Heights, Brooklyn, Jeffries added that he knew from experience that "the only thing that neighbors respect in a tough neighborhood is strength." In December 2016, Jeffries condemned the Obama Administration for not vetoing United Nations Security Council Resolution 2334 concerning Israeli settlements in occupied Palestinian territories.

As a member of Congress, he called for a Department of Justice investigation into the circumstances of Eric Garner's death. On a visit to the Staten Island site where Garner was killed, recorded by a CNN news crew in December 2014, Jeffries encountered Gwen Carr, Garner's mother. In April 2015, he stood with Carr to announce the introduction of the Excessive Use of Force Prevention Act of 2015 that would make the use of a chokehold illegal under federal law. Jeffries has also called on the New York City Police Department Commissioner to reform its marijuana arrest policy after reports showed that low-level marijuana arrests, which had increased dramatically under Mayor Michael Bloomberg's administration's application of stop-and-frisk, were still rising in New York City under Bloomberg's successor, Bill de Blasio. Jeffries has become a high-profile critic of de Blasio and NYPD Commissioner William Bratton, questioning whether the reduction in stop-and-frisk has been a product of mayoral administration changes or the results of a movement that brought a successful federal lawsuit, and criticizing Garner's chokehold death.

As the Congressional Black Caucus whip, he has been actively involved in maintaining the CBC's historic role as "the conscience of the Congress". In his CBC role, he has addressed special orders on the House floor, including regarding voting rights (after the Supreme Court decision on the 1965 Voting Rights Act) and in December 2014, leading CBC members in a "hands up, don't shoot" protest to protest the killings of African-Americans by police. After the shootings in Charleston in June 2015 by a white supremacist inspired by the Confederate flag, Jeffries led the effort to have the flag removed for sale or display on National Park Service land, an amendment eventually killed by the Republican House leadership after its initial support and inclusion on voice vote. During dramatic debate on the House floor, Jeffries stood next to the Confederate battle flag, said he "got chills" and lamented that the "Ghosts of the Confederacy have invaded the GOP".

As the congressperson with among the highest number of public housing residents, Jeffries focused on being attentive to their needs. He introduced P.J.'s Act in response to the death of six-year-old P.J. Avitto of East New York, who was stabbed in an elevator inside the Boulevard Houses, a NYCHA apartment complex. The legislation would increase federal funding for enhanced security in public housing developments. With a high concentration of public housing and high unemployment in his district, Jeffries has also made an issue of HUD's failure to adequately enforce Section 3 of its initial creating statute from 1968, which explicitly required that federally funded capital and rehabilitation projects in public housing developments had to employ residents of those developments. Jeffries said, "we can download the power of the federal government into neighborhoods that are struggling the most, without legislative action. The most promising area is Section 3."

Jeffries supports banning discrimination based on sexual orientation and gender identity. In 2019, he voted in favor of the Equality Act and urged Congress members to do the same. Jeffries voted to impeach President Donald Trump during both his first and second impeachments in the House. He repeatedly called Trump's presidency "illegitimate" due to the Russian interference in the 2016 United States presidential election.

Among the practices Jeffries has carried over to Congress from his service in the State Assembly are Operation Preserve, a legal housing clinic for displaced residents in the community; Summer at the Subway, now known as "Congress on Your Corner"; outdoor evening office hours from June through August near subway stations that allow him to connect and hear constituents' concerns firsthand; and his annual "State of the District" address, a community event in January that reviews milestones achieved in the past year and previews his goals for the year ahead.

Jeffries is a firm supporter of Israel's right to exist but not necessarily Israel's policies though described as "one the most pro-Israel Democrats in the House". Pro-Israel groups donated nearly half a million dollars to Jeffries's 2022 campaign, second only to donations from the financial industry.

Syria
In 2023, Jeffries voted against H.Con.Res. 21 which directed President Joe Biden to remove U.S. troops from Syria within 180 days.

Endorsements

In 2007, while still in his first term in the State Assembly, Jeffries endorsed and supported Barack Obama, and was among Obama's earliest supporters in Hillary Clinton's home state. In one interview, he said, "When I first ran for office, some people suggested that someone with the name 'Hakeem Jeffries' could never get elected, and when I saw someone with the name 'Barack Obama' get elected to the U.S. Senate, it certainly inspired me."

While Obama did not openly support candidates in Democratic primaries, he and President Bill Clinton together took a photograph with Jeffries weeks before his 2012 Congressional primary against Charles Barron, which was effectively used in campaign literature.

In a 2012 special election, Jeffries endorsed Walter T. Mosley, who won a special election run to succeed Jeffries in the State Assembly.

The next year, Jeffries backed Laurie Cumbo in the hotly contested race for Brooklyn's 35th city council seat vacated by Tish James, who won the citywide race for Public Advocate, also with Jeffries's endorsement.

In 2013, Jeffries endorsed Kenneth Thompson in the race for Brooklyn District Attorney, the seat held since 1990 by Charles Hynes, whose office was facing deep criticism for wrongful convictions and botched prosecutions. Jeffries had met Thompson while interning at the U.S. Attorney's Office for the Eastern District in the 1990s, when Thompson was a prosecutor. According to journalists, Jeffries's endorsement of Thompson was critical, and was followed by endorsements of Thompson by Brooklyn's three other Democratic members of Congress. Thompson won the Democratic primary and defeated Hynes again in the general election when Hynes ran as a Republican.

In the 2013 NYC mayoral race, Jeffries endorsed City Comptroller Bill Thompson, hailing his experience in city government. Jeffries also noted he was offended by Bill de Blasio's ad featuring stop and frisk claiming himself as the only candidate who would address, modify or reform stop and frisk:

His support of Thompson over de Blasio came in spite of Jeffries's own support of two policing bills, for independent inspector general for the police department and to allow for bias suits in state court, which de Blasio backed but Thompson did not. Jeffries said it made sense for Thompson, because he was running to be the city's top executive, not to support them.

In 2014, he supported Rubain Dorancy as Democratic candidate for state senate, who lost to Jesse Hamilton by a wide margin.

In that race, as in several others since 2012, Jeffries has endorsed opponents of candidates endorsed by Eric Adams, which has created the perception of a rivalry between them. Both Jeffries and Adams have dismissed these perceptions, noting their shared history (they had together served as prime co-sponsors of the 2010 stop-frisk database bill in the state legislature), with Jeffries adding: "Over the years, we've often disagreed about the best candidate for our community. But when the election is over, we should all work together to get things done."

In 2015, calls were made among prominent African-American pastors for Jeffries to step into the 2017 Democratic primary for mayor against de Blasio. Jeffries said he had "no interest" and wished to remain an effective member of Congress.

In the 2016 election cycle, Jeffries endorsed Hillary Clinton for president, in spite of previously "bucking the New York establishment" by endorsing Obama over Clinton in the 2008 presidential primary. After Clinton lost the electoral college, he claimed her loss was due to her lack of "clear, decisive economic message" in using "Stronger Together" as a campaign slogan and her failure to relate to white working-class voters' anxieties.

In the 2020 election cycle, after Tara Reade came forward with sexual assault allegations against then-presumptive nominee Joe Biden, Jeffries called for the need for the allegation "to be investigated seriously" because the allegations were "raised by a serious individual". As the fifth highest-ranking House Democrat, he also recommended the Biden campaign take either California Representative Karen Bass or Florida Representative Val Demings as his running mate.

In June 2020, after 31-year incumbent Representative Eliot Engel faced backlash for "an inartful statement", Jeffries threw his full support behind Engel 10 days before the 2020 New York Democratic primaries. Engel lost in the primaries to Jamaal Bowman. The same month, Jeffries endorsed New Jersey Representative Josh Gottheimer for reelection, as well as Mimi Rocah for Westchester District Attorney.

In 2023, Jeffries spoke in support of New York Governor Kathy Hochul's nomination of Hector LaSalle as chief judge of the New York Court of Appeals, calling him "highly qualified to serve as the chief judge. Period, full stop".

Personal life
Jeffries is married to Kennisandra Arciniegas-Jeffries, a social worker with 1199 SEIU's Benefit Fund. They have two sons and live in Prospect Heights, Brooklyn.

Jeffries is a Baptist.

Jeffries's younger brother, Hasan Kwame Jeffries, is an associate professor of history at Ohio State University and the author of Bloody Lowndes: Civil Rights and Black Power in Alabama's Black Belt. Hakeem and Hasan are the nephews of Leonard Jeffries, a former professor at City College of New York.

See also

 List of African-American United States representatives

References

External links

Congressman Hakeem Jeffries official U.S. House website
Hakeem Jeffries for Congress official campaign website
Hakeem Jeffries wiki quotes 

|-

|-

|-

|-

|-

1970 births
2008 United States presidential electors
2012 United States presidential electors
21st-century American politicians
African-American members of the United States House of Representatives
African-American state legislators in New York (state)
Baptists from New York (state)
Baptists from the United States
Binghamton University alumni
Democratic Party members of the United States House of Representatives from New York (state)
Minority leaders of the United States House of Representatives
McCourt School of Public Policy alumni
Lawyers from New York City
Living people
Democratic Party members of the New York State Assembly
Midwood High School alumni
New York University School of Law alumni
Paul, Weiss, Rifkind, Wharton & Garrison people
People from Prospect Heights, Brooklyn
People from Crown Heights, Brooklyn
Politicians from Brooklyn
Paramount Global people
21st-century African-American politicians
20th-century African-American people
20th-century Baptists
21st-century Baptists